Pleopeltis segregata is a species of fern in the family Polypodiaceae. It is endemic to Ecuador.  Its natural habitat is subtropical or tropical moist montane forests.

References

segregata
Ferns of Ecuador
Endemic flora of Ecuador
Ferns of the Americas
Least concern plants
Taxonomy articles created by Polbot
Taxobox binomials not recognized by IUCN